Salvino is a surname. Notable people with the surname include:

 Carmen Salvino (born 1933), American professional ten-pin bowler, inventor, author, and ambassador
 Mike Salvino, American business executive

See also
 Salvini (surname)